Unhappily Ever After is an American sitcom television series that aired for 100 episodes on The WB from January 11, 1995, to May 23, 1999, for a total of five seasons. The series was produced by Touchstone Television.

Synopsis
The series follows the Malloy family of Los Angeles, California: father Jack (Geoff Pierson); mother Jennie (Stephanie Hodge); dim-witted eldest son Ryan (Kevin Connolly); daughter Tiffany (Nikki Cox); and "forgotten" son Ross (Justin Berfield). In the first two seasons, storylines featured Jennie's pill-popping mother Maureen Slattery (Joyce Van Patten).

The series was initially written as a starring vehicle for Hodge, whose character Jennie was the focus of the first few episodes. However, the series soon turned its focus to Jack, a schizophrenic who had been kicked out of the house in the pilot episode and was living in an apartment with his only "friend": his son's talking toy rabbit, Mr. Floppy (Bobcat Goldthwait). By the show's third season, Tiffany had become a breakout character, and Cox became the de facto co-star of the show along with Pierson. Stories began focusing more on Tiffany and Ryan's escapades at high school, and later community college.

In the fourth season, producers tried to kill off Jennie's increasingly unnecessary character and return her as a ghost. Negative audience reaction made them quickly reverse this action.  The character was brought back to life in a deliberately bizarre sequence in which a network executive wandered onto the set and announced that she was no longer dead. Nevertheless, Hodge decided to leave the show, and several episodes after Jennie's bizarre reappearance, she abandoned her family for a lesbian lover and was never seen again.

The final season focused more on Tiffany, with her rival Barbara Caufield (Wendy Benson) joining the cast. The series wrapped up with a final episode in which Jack finally made enough money to send Tiffany to Harvard University. Once Jack started making money, he no longer needed Floppy, with his schizophrenia seemingly "cured", and Floppy returned to being just a stuffed animal. However, Jack's return to drinking brought Floppy "back from the dead."

Characters

Main
 Jack Malloy (Geoff Pierson): an alcoholic, schizophrenic, cynical, depressed man who hates his unhappy marriage and wholly unsatisfying used-car-salesman job. His family gives him little respect, thinking him insane or senile. He converses with a stuffed bunny (Mr. Floppy) that only he can hear. He is the family's sole income source, paying for food, expenses, allowances, and gifts for Tiffany. In season one, Jack and Jenny were separated, but Jack moved back home in season two, with the couple still hating each other; they later divorce after Jennie leaves the family in season five.

 Jennifer "Jennie" Malloy (née Slattery) (Stephanie Hodge) (seasons 1–4): Jack's embittered wife, who gets along with nobody and is prone to jealousy. She is sarcastic, self-centered, mean, judgmental and ill-tempered; she is verbally abusive to Jack and shows her children little compassion. She resents Ryan – as her pregnancy with him forced her to marry Jack – and Tiffany, who is everything she never was. Jennie often cuckolds Jack, but hypocritically objects when Jack becomes involved with other women. She "dies" during season 4 and haunts the series as a "ghost" until returning briefly. At the start of the fifth season, she has left the family for a lesbian lover.

 Ryan Malloy (Kevin Connolly): Jennie and Jack's firstborn and elder son. He maintains a happy-go-lucky attitude despite being stupid and disliked by nearly everyone he knows, including his own parents. His inability to attract girls and his parents' overt derision of him are recurring themes throughout the series.

 Tiffany Malloy (Nikki Cox): the middle child and only daughter – and Jack's favorite – who is seemingly "perfect": smart, ambitious, popular, beautiful, and still a virgin—although she is far from virtuous; she tends to be self-indulgent and manipulative and often takes advantage of Jack's special treatment. Whenever she gets into trouble, she will use Ryan or Ross as a scapegoat. She is also a practicing gold digger. Tiffany's figure has been repeatedly alluded to as a result of her suffering from some kind of an eating disorder. She is an overachiever: she covets success and frequently achieves it. She is extremely opinionated and can be very sarcastic, speaking with deadpan humor.

 Ross Malloy (Justin Berfield): the youngest son and "forgotten child", who is arguably the most normal family member. Ross is often the voice of reason, common sense, and enlightenment in an otherwise-dysfunctional family. However, certain episodes show that Ross has his own issues. As a result of indifferent parenting, he craves attention, though his attempts usually fail. Despite Jack's lack of concern for him, Ross adores his father, even letting him have his stuffed rabbit Mr. Floppy to keep him company. Ross dislikes his siblings: Tiffany for being a cruel, selfish attention-seeker, and Ryan for being stupid and annoying. The Halloween episode of the final season mentions that Ross once had a twin, Roz, but in a flashback to a decade earlier, they and Tiffany were left in Ryan's "care" for a weekend, and his carelessness caused something unfortunate to happen to Roz.

 Mr. Floppy (voice of Bobcat Goldthwait, puppeteer Allan Trautman): a smoking, drinking, perverted, gray stuffed bunny who lives in the Malloy basement, often discussing his life in "the toy bin" or his success stories with women, or ranting about cynical topics. Much of the show has Jack consulting Mr. Floppy for advice with Mr. Floppy speaking as a stand-up comic. Only Jack can hear him. While Jack and Mr. Floppy often have differing views, they have similar mindsets, so Mr. Floppy is best seen as Jack's alter-ego. He has a crush on Drew Barrymore.

 Maureen Slattery (Joyce Van Patten) (seasons 1–2): Jennie's alcoholic, overbearing, somewhat-delusional mother who has a prescription drug addiction. She despises Jack (the feeling is more than mutual), but she has even more contempt for her own daughter. Her ex-husband Joe (who is never seen, but frequently mentioned) owns Joe's Used Car Lot, where Jack is employed. She only appeared in the series' first two seasons; in the episode "The Old West", Jack says she is dead and they buried her in the back yard after looting her corpse.

 Barbara Caulfield (Wendy Benson) (season 5; recurring Season 4): Tiffany's rival and one of Ryan's love interests. She attends Northridge Junior College along with Tiffany and Ryan.

Recurring
 Emily, Jasper and Annie, the family's pet dogs
 Barry Wallenstein (Ant) (seasons 1–4), Tiffany's openly gay friend at Priddy High
 Amber Moss (Dana Daurey) (seasons 1–3), Tiffany's vacuous best friend at Priddy High
 Mr. Dunn (Allan Trautman) (seasons 1–3), the principal of Priddy High
 Chelsea (Shonda Whipple) (season 1), Tiffany's nemesis
 Beau/Johnny (Benjamin Shelfer) (seasons 1-4), Tiffany's love interest
 Stoney (Jamie Kennedy) (season 1), a stoner at Priddy High
 Patty McGurk (Elisabeth Harnois) (season 2), Tiffany's rival
 Sable O'Brien (Kristanna Loken) (season 3), a popular girl at Priddy High and Tiffany's nemesis
 Mr. Monteleone (Oliver Muirhead) (seasons 3–4), Tiffany and Ryan's English teacher
 Eddie the Neuter Boy (Tal Kapelner) (season 4), a nerd who is often the victim of bullies
 Muffy (Deborah Kellner) (season 5), Tiffany's best friend at Northridge Junior College

Episodes

Production notes
The series was created by Ron Leavitt and Arthur Silver, who also worked on Married... with Children. Unhappily was often compared to Married... with Children as both series had similar themes.

Unhappily Ever After was one of the four sitcoms that aired as part of the original Wednesday night two-hour lineup that helped launch The WB network (along with The Wayans Bros., The Parent 'Hood and the short-lived Muscle).

Theme song and opening sequence
When the show first began its run, the original opening started with the "wedding photo" (even though they are moving in it) of the Malloys, with their smiles fading, and showed clips of the father leaving and walking through the slum to his new place. While walking, a man runs by him holding a TV, chased by another man who stops, takes a shooting stance, and fires a gun at the thief. The next clip shows the father as he walks past the first man lying face down, TV near his hands, as he enters his apartment. The theme song played over the opening was Bobcat Goldthwait (and possibly others) singing "We married young, because of cupid. And had three kids, but we were stupid. She kicked me out, she's not my honey. But she still wants me, when she needs money. Now I'm alone, come rain or sunny. But who needs love? I've got my bunny." In the final scene of the final episode, this is the song Jack sings with Mr. Floppy, but with slightly modified lyrics. "I married young, because of cupid. And had three kids, but you were stupid. I could've been rich, instead I'm a loser. But at least we're happy, 'cause you're a boozer. Now I'm alone, come rain or sunny. But who needs love? I've got my bunny."

Beginning with the second season, the series' theme song was "Hit the Road Jack" by Ray Charles; the song is a reference to Jennie kicking Jack out of the house. The opening is a sequence of bizarre events from the first season and the male vocals are lip-synced by Floppy while the female vocals are lip-synced by Jennie, Tiffany and Maureen for seasons 1 and 2, Jennie and Tiffany for seasons 3 and 4, and Tiffany, Jack, Ryan and Ross for season 5. In reruns and syndication, the season 1 opening was replaced with the "Hit The Road Jack" opening with clips from the show.

Syndication and international airings
The show was sold into syndication for the 1999–2000 and the 2000–01 seasons, but was not re-offered the following fall due to lackluster clearance rates and low ratings. It has been off the air in America ever since. As of January 2022, the show is not available on any streaming service in the United States. It has also never received a release on physical media.

In Brazil, it was called Infelizes Para Sempre (Unhappy Forever) airing on SBT in 2003.

In Finland, it was called Rakkaat viholliset (Dear Enemies).

In Italy, it was shown on Rai 2 as E vissero infelici per sempre (And they lived unhappy forever) from 2000 until 2003.

In Mexico, it has the same title as the American version.

In Spain, it was called Infelices para siempre (Unhappy Forever).

In the United Kingdom, it was shown on ABC1 between 2004 and 2005.

In Canada, it was seen on Omni Television during the 2006/2007 season.

As of October 2007, it airs on the TV3 network in Estonia as Armastuseta sinu (Yours Without Love).

In Germany, the show first aired on RTL Television in November 1997, was since rerun on RTL II and currently (as of June 2007) airs on Comedy Central on a daily basis. It is titled Auf schlimmer und ewig ("For worse and ever"), a pun on the phrase "Auf immer und ewig" ("Forever and ever").

There were also versions in Bulgaria and Russia.

References

External links

Unhappily Ever After fansite

1990s American black comedy television series
1990s American sitcoms
1995 American television series debuts
1999 American television series endings
American television shows featuring puppetry
English-language television shows
Fictional portrayals of schizophrenia
Sentient toys in fiction
Television series about dysfunctional families
Television series by ABC Studios
Television shows set in Los Angeles
The WB original programming
Television series created by Ron Leavitt